Michael Joseph Gannon  (February 22, 1877 – March 19, 1931) was a pitcher in Major League Baseball who played for the St. Louis Browns of the National League during the  season.

External links
Baseball Reference

St. Louis Browns (NL) players
19th-century baseball players
Major League Baseball pitchers
Baseball players from Missouri
1877 births
1931 deaths